Chopped Canada is a Canadian reality cooking television series based on the US series Chopped. The program pits four chefs against each other as they compete to win $10,000 and the title of Chopped Canada Champion. It first aired on January 2, 2014 and last aired on February 11, 2017. In May 2017, the show's producers announced that Food Network Canada had cancelled the show.

Format

In each episode, four chefs go head to head and compete to create a delicious three course meal.  The competition is divided into three rounds: "Appetizer", "Entrée", and "Dessert". In each round, the chefs are presented with a mystery basket containing four ingredients, and the challenge is to incorporate those mystery ingredients into an appetizing dish.  The ingredients are generally diverse items which are not commonly prepared together.

The chef competitors are given access to a pantry and refrigerator stocked with a wide variety of other ingredients, which they are free to use as they wish. Each round is timed (twenty or thirty minutes for the Appetizer round, thirty minutes each for the Entrée and Dessert rounds), and the chefs must cook their dishes and  complete four platings (three for the judges and one "beauty plate") before time runs out.

After each cooking round, there are three celebrity judges on hand to critique the dishes based on presentation, taste, and creativity.  The chef with the worst dish is "chopped" from the competition. Dean or Brad reveals the judges' decision by lifting a cloche on their table to show the losing chef's dish, and one of the judges comments on the reason for their choice to the eliminated chef. By the dessert round, only two chefs remain, and when deciding the winner, the judges consider not only on the dishes created by the two chefs during that round, but also their overall performance throughout the competition.  The winner is awarded a prize of $10,000, and the title of Chopped Canada Champion.

Teen Tournament

The third season opened with a special Teen Tournament (the first tournament on the Chopped Canada series), which saw 16 chefs (aged 13 to 17) compete over the course of four semi-final episodes. The winner of each semi-final episode went on to compete in the Teen Tournament final, which awarded a $20,000 grand prize to the Chopped Canada Teen Champion.

Host

The first two seasons of the show were hosted by Canadian actor Dean McDermott.  However, in early March 2015, it was announced that he would not be returning as host for the upcoming third season.

In June 2015, Shaw Media announced that former Canadian Football player and The Bachelor Canada Brad Smith would take over as host, despite not having any culinary experience.

Judges

The episodes feature a rotating panel of three celebrity judges.  Past and current notable judges include celebrity chefs Massimo Capra, Lynn Crawford, Eden Grinshpan, John Higgins, Chuck Hughes, Susur Lee, Mark McEwan, Roger Mooking, Antonio Park, Michael Smith, Vikram Vij and Anne Yarymowich.

Episode guide

In March 2016, it was announced by Shaw Media that the show had been renewed for a fourth season, with Brad Smith returning as the host. The season featured special themed episodes, including Grandmothers, Firefighters, Celebrities and the first ever Judges' episode where four of the rotating judges stepped into the kitchen to compete for money for charity. The season also included additional Teen episodes with competitors aged 14 to 18, as well as the addition of Junior episodes, showcasing talented young chefs aged 9 to 13.

References

External links
 
 

Food Network (Canadian TV channel) original programming
Food reality television series
English-language television shows
2014 Canadian television series debuts
2017 Canadian television series endings
Television series by Corus Entertainment
Television series by Entertainment One
2010s Canadian reality television series
2010s Canadian cooking television series
Cooking competitions in Canada